This is a list of Azerbaijan football transfers in the summer transfer window 2010 by club. Only clubs of the 2010–11 Azerbaijan Premier League are included.

Azerbaijan Premier League 2010–11

AZAL Baku

In:

 

Out:

Baku

In:

Out:

Gabala

In:

 

 

 

 

Out:

Ganja

In:

Out:

Inter Baku

In:

 

Out:

Khazar Lankaran

In:

 

 

Out:

FK Mughan

In:

Out:

MOIK Baku

In:

Out:

Neftchi Baku

In:

 

Out:

Qarabağ

In:

Out:

Simurq

In:

Out:

Turan

In:

Out:

References

Azerbaijan
Azerbaijani football transfer lists